Piety (Sawab) in Islam is one of the most important Islamic ethics. It is called commonly by Muslims taqwa.

In the Quran
In the Quran piety is defined as:

In the Hadith
Piety is defined in the hadith, a collection of Muhammad's sayings. It is reported by An-Nawwas bin Sam'an: 

Wabisah bin Ma’bad reported:

See also
Islamic views on sin

References

Islamic ethics
Point of view